Uta Thyra Hagen (12 June 1919 – 14 January 2004) was a German-American actress and theatre practitioner. She originated the role of Martha in the 1962 Broadway premiere of Who's Afraid of Virginia Woolf? by Edward Albee, who called her "a profoundly truthful actress." Because Hagen was on the Hollywood blacklist, in part because of her association with Paul Robeson, her film opportunities dwindled and she focused her career on New York theatre.

She later became a highly influential acting teacher at New York's Herbert Berghof Studio and authored best-selling acting texts, Respect for Acting, with Haskel Frankel,  and A Challenge for the Actor. Her most substantial contributions to theatre pedagogy were a series of "object exercises" that built on the work of Konstantin Stanislavski and Yevgeny Vakhtangov.

She was elected to the American Theater Hall of Fame in 1981. She twice won the Tony Award for Best Actress in a Play and received a Special Tony Award for Lifetime Achievement in 1999.

Life and career

Early life
Born in  Göttingen, Germany, daughter of Thyra A. (née Leisner), a trained opera singer, and Oskar Hagen, an art historian and musician, Hagen and her family emigrated to the United States in 1924. Though shipping records indicate that he took a position at Cornell University, his new position was in fact at the University of Wisconsin–Madison. Uta was raised in Madison, Wisconsin. She appeared in productions of the University of Wisconsin High School and in summer stock productions of the Wisconsin Players. She studied acting briefly at the Royal Academy of Dramatic Art in 1936. After spending one semester at the University of Wisconsin–Madison, where her father was the head of the department of art history, she left for New York City in 1937. Her first professional role was as Ophelia opposite Eva Le Gallienne in the title role of Hamlet in Dennis, Massachusetts, in 1936.

Career
Hagen was cast, early on, as Ophelia by the actress-manager Eva Le Gallienne. From there, Hagen went on to play the leading ingénue role of Nina in a Broadway production of Anton Chekhov's The Seagull which featured Alfred Lunt and Lynn Fontanne. It was 1938; Hagen was just 18.  This experience left an indelible mark on the young actress, as she later reflected, "My next job was Nina in The Seagull, [her Broadway bow] with the Lunts, on Broadway. That sounds incredible, too. They were an enormous influence on my life." She admired "their passion for the theatre, and their discipline. It was a 24-hour-a-day affair, and I never forgot it—never!" The New York Times critic Brooks Atkinson hailed her Nina as "grace and aspiration incarnate."

She played George Bernard Shaw's Saint Joan (1951) on Broadway, and Desdemona in a production which toured and played Broadway, featuring Paul Robeson as Shakespeare's Othello and her then-husband José Ferrer as Iago. She took over the role of Blanche DuBois in A Streetcar Named Desire for the national tour, which was directed not by Elia Kazan who had directed the Broadway production but by Harold Clurman.  Hagen had had a revelatory experience when she first worked with Clurman in 1947. In Respect for Acting, she credited her discoveries with Clurman as the springboard for what she would later explore with her husband Herbert Berghof: "how to find a true technique of acting, how to make a character flow through me." She played Blanche (on the road and on Broadway) opposite at least four different Stanley Kowalskis, including Anthony Quinn and Marlon Brando. Through interviews with her and contemporary criticism, the report is that Hagen's Blanche refocused the audience's sympathies with Blanche rather than with Stanley (where the Brando/Kazan production had leaned).  Primarily noted for stage roles, Hagen won her first Tony Award in 1951 for her performance as the self-sacrificing wife Georgie in Clifford Odets' The Country Girl.  She won again in 1963 for originating the role of Martha in Edward Albee's Who's Afraid of Virginia Woolf?. In 1981 she was elected to the American Theater Hall of Fame and in 1999 received a "Special Lifetime Achievement Tony Award."

Hagen considered the period between 1938 and 1947 as "the transitional years of my career, during which I lost my way and a love of acting until I finally regained it to begin a true life in the theater."

Although she appeared in some movies, because of the Hollywood blacklist she had more limited output in film and on television, not making her cinematic debut until 1972. She would later comment about being blacklisted, "that fact kept me pure."

She was nominated for a Daytime Emmy Award as "Outstanding Supporting Actress in a Drama Series" for her performance on the television soap opera One Life to Live.

She taught at HB Studio, a well-known New York City acting school on a cobblestone, tree-shaded street in the West Village. She began there in 1947, and married its co-founder, Herbert Berghof, on 25 January 1957. Later in her life, Hagen undertook a return to the stage, earning accolades for leading roles in Mrs. Warren's Profession (1985), Collected Stories, and Mrs. Klein. After Berghof's death in 1990, she became the school's chairperson.
  
Hagen was an influential acting teacher who taught, among others, Matthew Broderick, Christine Lahti, Amanda Peet, Jason Robards, Sigourney Weaver, Katie Finneran, Liza Minnelli, Whoopi Goldberg, Jack Lemmon, Charles Nelson Reilly, Manu Tupou, Debbie Allen, Herschel Savage, George Segal, Jon Stewart, and Al Pacino. She was a voice coach to Judy Garland, teaching a German accent, for the picture Judgment at Nuremberg. Garland's performance earned her an Academy Award nomination.

She also wrote Respect for Acting (1973) and A Challenge for the Actor (1991), which advocate realistic acting (as opposed to pre-determined "formalistic" acting). In her mode of realism, the actor puts his own psyche to use in finding identification with the role," trusting that a form will result. In Respect for Acting, Hagen credited director Harold Clurman with a turn-around in her perspective on acting:

In 1947, I worked in a play under the direction of Harold Clurman. He opened a new world in the professional theatre for me. He took away my 'tricks'. He imposed no line readings, no gestures, no positions on the actors. At first I floundered badly because for many years I had become accustomed to using specific outer directions as the material from which to construct the mask for my character, the mask behind which I would hide throughout the performance. Mr Clurman refused to accept a mask. He demanded ME in the role. My love of acting was slowly reawakened as I began to deal with a strange new technique of evolving in the character. I was not allowed to begin with, or concern myself at any time with, a preconceived form. I was assured that a form would result from the work we were doing.

Hagen later "disassociated" herself from her first book, Respect for Acting. In Challenge for the Actor, she redefined a term which she had initially called "substitution", an esoteric technique for alchemizing elements of an actor's life with his/her character work, calling it "transference" instead. Though Hagen wrote that the actor should identify the character he plays with feelings and circumstances from his own life, she also makes clear that:Thoughts and feelings are suspended in a vacuum unless they instigate and feed the selected actions, and it is the characters' actions which reveal the character in the play.

Respect for Acting is used as a textbook for many college acting classes. She also wrote a 1976 cookbook, Love for Cooking. In 2002, she was awarded the National Medal of Arts by President George W. Bush at a ceremony held at the White House.

In 2001, Hagen agreed to be filmed giving master classes in NYC, LA, Toronto and Chicago by Karen Ludwig and Pennie du Pont, who released the video entitled Uta Hagen's Acting Class, a two-part set that captures her master classes. The video has been thoroughly studied and is now taught in many acting classes.

Harvey Korman talks about studying under her during his Archive of American Television interview in 2004. David Hyde Pierce worked with Hagen in the Richard Alfieri play Six Dance Lessons in Six Weeks, at the Geffen Playhouse in 2001. Hyde Pierce spoke at her 2004 memorial at Manhattan's Majestic Theater.

Students of Uta Hagen

Gene Wilder 
Robert DeNiro 
Daniel DeWeldon 
Steve McQueen
Tony Goldwyn 
Orson Bean
Faye Dunaway 
Gene Hackman
Laura Esterman 
Carol Rosenfeld 
Hal Holbrook 
Hal Holden 
Sandy Dennis 
Griffin Dunne 
Jeffrey Essmann 
Delaney Hibbits 
Marc Durso 
Robert LuPone 
Daniel Gnad 
Barbara Feldon 
Tovah Feldshuh 
Michael Paré
Katie Finneran 
Constance Ford 
Victor Garber 
Jerry Stiller
Anne Meara
Rita Gardner 
Charles Nelson Reilly 
Lee Grant 
Charles Grodin 
Eileen Heckart 
Deborah Hedwall 
William Hickey 
Gerald Hiken 
Anne Jackson 
Harvey Korman 
Geraldine Page 
Jason Robards, Jr. 
Matthew Broderick 
Corey Parker 
Whoopi Goldberg 
Amanda Peet 
Jack Lemmon 
Ted Brunetti 
Lindsay Crouse 
Fritz Weaver 
Kevin Sussman 
Rochelle Oliver 
Rene Napoli

Personal life
Uta Hagen was married to José Ferrer from 1938 until 1948. They had one child together, their daughter Leticia (born 15 October 1940). They divorced partly because of Hagen's long-concealed affair with Paul Robeson, her co-star in Othello. Hagen married Herbert Berghof on 25 January 1957, a union that lasted for 33 years until his death in 1990. Hagen died in Greenwich Village in 2004 after suffering a stroke in 2001.

In popular culture

In 2009, Weird Al Yankovic’s “Skipper Dan” referenced Uta Hagen in the opening verse:

I starred in every high school play 
Blew every drama teacher away 
I graduated first in my class at Juilliard 
Took every acting workshop I could 
And I dreamed of Hollywood 
While I read my Uta Hagen 
and studied the Bard

Theatre
 Name dropped in the song La Vie Bohème from the 1996 award winning and groundbreaking rock opera Rent written and composed by the late Jonathan Larson "To the stage, To Uta, To Buddha, Pablo Neruda too."

Work

Stage
 The Seagull (1938)
 The Happiest Days (1939)
 Key Largo (1939)
 Vickie (1942)
 Othello (1943)
 The Whole World Over (1947)
 A Streetcar Named Desire (1947)
 The Country Girl (1950)
 Saint Joan (1951)
 In Any Language (1952)
 The Magic and The Loss (1954)
 Island of Goats (1955)
 Who's Afraid of Virginia Woolf? (1962)
 The Cherry Orchard (1968)
 You Never Can Tell (1986)
 Charlotte (1980)
 Mrs. Klein (1995)
 Collected Stories (1998)
 Six Dance Lessons in Six Weeks (2001)

Film
 The Other (1972) - Ada
 The Boys from Brazil (1978) - Frieda Maloney
 Reversal of Fortune (1990) - Maria
 Limón: A Life Beyond Words (2001) - Narrator

Television
 Victory (1945, TV Movie)
 A Month in the Country (1959) - Natalia Petrovna
 The Day Before Sunday (1970) - Annamae Whiteley
 A Doctor's Story (1984, TV Movie) - Mrs. Hilda Reiner
 The Twilight Zone (1986) - Gloria (segment "The Library")
 Seasonal Differences (1987) - Omi
 The Sunset Gang (1991) - Sophie (segment "The Home")
 King of the Hill (1999) - Maureen (voice)
 Oz (1999) - Mama Rebadow

Awards and nominations
 1951 Tony Award, Actress—Play, The Country Girl"
 1963 Tony Award, Actress—Play, Who's Afraid of Virginia Woolf?''
 Special 1999 Tony Award for Lifetime Achievement
 1999 Fellow of the American Academy of Arts and Sciences
 2002 National Medal of Arts

Hagen was quoted, saying, "Awards don't really mean much."

Quotes
 "Once in a while, there's stuff that makes me say, 'That's what theatre's about'. It has to be a human event on the stage, and that doesn't happen very often."

References

External links
 
 
 
 
 , Library for the Performing Arts

1919 births
2004 deaths
Actors from Göttingen
People from the Province of Hanover
American acting theorists
Theatre practitioners
American film actresses
American stage actresses
American television actresses
Donaldson Award winners
Drama teachers
Fellows of the American Academy of Arts and Sciences
German emigrants to the United States
Hollywood blacklist
Actors from Madison, Wisconsin
Special Tony Award recipients
Tony Award winners
United States National Medal of Arts recipients
University of Wisconsin–Madison alumni
20th-century American actresses
21st-century American actresses
Actresses from Wisconsin
Ferrer family (acting)